Nikasil is a trademarked electrodeposited lipophilic nickel matrix silicon carbide coating for engine components, mainly piston engine cylinder liners.

Development
Nikasil was introduced by Mahle in 1967, and was initially developed to allow Wankel engine apex seals (NSU Ro 80, Citroën GS Birotor and Mercedes C111) to work directly against the aluminium housing. This coating allowed aluminium cylinders and pistons to work directly against each other with low wear and friction. Unlike other methods, including cast iron cylinder liners, Nikasil allowed very large cylinder bores with tight tolerances. This made it possible for existing engine designs to be expanded easily. The aluminium cylinders also gave a much better heat conductivity than cast iron liners, an important attribute for a high-output engine. The coating was further developed as a replacement for hard-chrome plated cylinder bores for Mercury Marine Racing, Kohler Engines, and as a repair replacement for factory-chromed snowmobiles, dirt bikes, ATVs, watercraft and automotive V8 liners/bores.

Nikasil is short for Nickel Silicon Carbide. Silicon carbide is a very hard ceramic (much harder than steel) that can be dissolved in nickel. The nickel solution can then be electroplated onto the aluminium cylinder bore. The piston rings will then rub off the exposed nickel, leaving a very hard layer of silicon carbide to prevent the cast iron/steel piston rings directly contacting the aluminium cylinder. With this setup, the engine tolerances can be much tighter for better performance. The cylinder must be re-plated after it is re-bored, but Nikasil is extremely durable, so the cylinder does not need to be reworked as often as an iron or chrome cylinder.

Applications
Porsche started using Nikasil on the 1970 917 race car, and later on the 1973 911 RS. Porsche also used it on production cars, but for a short time switched to Alusil due to cost savings for their base 911. Nikasil cylinders were always used for the 911 Turbo and RS models. Nikasil coated aluminium cylinders allowed Porsche to build air-cooled engines that had the highest specific output of any engine of their time.

Nikasil was very popular in the 1990s. It was used by companies such as BMW, Ducati, Jaguar and Moto Guzzi in their new engine families. However, the sulfur found in much of the world's low-quality gasoline caused some Nikasil cylinders to break down over time, causing costly engine failures.

Nikasil or similar coatings under other trademarks are also still widely used in racing engines, including those used in Formula One and ChampCar. Suzuki uses a nickel phosphorus-silicon-carbide proprietary coating trademarked SCEM (Suzuki Composite Electro-chemical Material) to maximize cylinder size and improve heat dissipation in the TU250X, Hayabusa, Honda NX250 Enduro, and other motorcycles.

See also
List of automotive superlatives
Nigusil
Alusil

References

Engine technology
Nickel alloys